A fantasy video game console (or simply fantasy console) is an emulator for a fictional video game console. In short, it aims to create the experience of retrogaming without the need to emulate a real console, allowing the developer to freely decide what specifications their fictional hardware will have.

One popular example of a fantasy console is the PICO-8, which was used as the platform for the original Celeste game. Though many fantasy consoles, such as the PICO-8, the TIC-80 and the Pixel Vision 8, use the Lua programming language, a variety of other languages, such as JavaScript and Python, are supported by other fantasy consoles. Even if two consoles use the same programming language, that doesn't mean they are compatible. There are often subtle differences in the syntax, and most notably in the API. There are some tools trying to automatically convert these console's cartridges (including the scripts), but they aren't perfect.

Another example is the Gigadrive, an imaginary revision of Sega Genesis designed by M2, who also developed an emulator of this system. This console was given double VRAM, four more background layers and Z-values in each layer and sprites to archive 3D effects in patched Genesis games. These emulated games were sold in Nintendo 3DS under the label 3D Classics.

As of November 2021, fantasy consoles PICO-8 and TIC-80 are among the top 20 most used game development platforms on itch.io.

Definition 
Joseph White, creator of PICO-8, coined the term "fantasy console", and describes it as follows:

As developer Björn Ritzl puts it, fantasy consoles simulate the restricted hardware of an old system packaged into a user friendly experience with integrated tools for asset creation and game logic programming.

See also 
 TIS-100 – A video game where the player programs a fictional 1970s computer.

References 

Fantasy video game consoles
Fantasy console